Mariano Messera (born 23 February 1978) is an Argentine football manager and former player who played as a midfielder.

Career
Born  in Posadas, Messera started his playing career in 1997 for Gimnasia La Plata, where he played 160 league games and scored 36 goals.

In 2002, he played for Cruz Azul in Mexico before returning to Argentina to play for Rosario Central until 2004 when he had a short spell with Calcio Catania.

In 2005, Messera played for San Lorenzo, O'Higgins in Chile, and Skoda Xanthi of Greece before returning to Rosario Central in 2007.

Coaching career
After Gustavo Alfaro was fired in May 2017, Messera and Leandro Martini was appointed joint caretaker manager. In November 2019, the duo was appointed caretaker managers once again after Diego Maradona left. However, two days later, Maradona rejoined the club.

References

External links
 
 
 
 
  

1978 births
Living people
People from Posadas, Misiones
Argentine people of Italian descent
Argentine footballers
Argentine football managers
Association football midfielders
Club de Gimnasia y Esgrima La Plata footballers
Rosario Central footballers
San Lorenzo de Almagro footballers
Cruz Azul footballers
Catania S.S.D. players
Xanthi F.C. players
O'Higgins F.C. footballers
San Martín de San Juan footballers
Argentine expatriate footballers
Expatriate footballers in Chile
Expatriate footballers in Mexico
Expatriate footballers in Italy
Expatriate footballers in Greece
Argentine expatriate sportspeople in Greece
Argentine expatriate sportspeople in Italy
Argentine expatriate sportspeople in Mexico
Argentine Primera División players
Liga MX players
Serie B players
Super League Greece players
Club de Gimnasia y Esgrima La Plata managers
Argentine Primera División managers
Sportspeople from Misiones Province